Araknofobia is an electronic music group formed by Cino Berigliano, Jon Pearn, Michael Gray and Nick Ratcliffe  who scored minor success in the early 1990s. Their debut single, "Arachnophobia (I Want U)" peaked at number forty-one in 1992. The group also appeared on the gold-selling compilation Don't Techno for an Answer, Vol. 1.

Singles and EPs
"Arachnophobia (I Want U)" (1991)
"Out There" (1991)
"The Calling" (1991)	
Feeling High E.P. (1992) 	
"The Calling/Out There" (1993)	 	
"I'm Here You're Here" (1995)

References

Electronic music groups